30 Rock: A XXX Parody is an American pornographic film released on August 24, 2009. It parodies the television comedy series 30 Rock. The film was directed by Lee Roy Myers and produced by the company New Sensations, who had also created parodies such as Scrubs: A XXX Parody and Seinfeld: A XXX Parody. Lisa Ann, who parodied Sarah Palin in Who's Nailin' Paylin?, stars as Liz Lemon, the character originally played by Tina Fey, who parodied Palin herself on Saturday Night Live.

The film is based on a sketch comedy television show, TCS with Trey Jordan, whose ratings head writer Liz Limon (Lisa Ann) has to boost by adding more sex to. The film's five sex scenes include a scene between network executive Jake (Herschel Savage) and assistant Karina (Evie Delatosso), and actress Jenny (Ashlynn Brooke) having sex with a writer before she cons him creating a sketch for her. The film ends with a sex tape of Limon and boyfriend Danny (James Deen) accidentally being aired on the show.

A review by Adult Video News called the film a "blandly-written and at times just plain boring comedy", but praised the acting by Bishop, Ashlynn Brooke and Paul Woodcrest. Remarking on Lisa Ann's performance, compared with her success in Who's Nailin' Paylin?, the review stated "sadly, Lisa's funnier trying to be serious than she is when trying to be funny". An XBIZ review stated that the "main players are really good" and that the character Trey Jordan (Bishop) is "hilarious". New York magazine commented "it's actually disturbing how true to the show this thing is ... Someone out there in porn-making land has actually done their 30 Rock homework".

Commenting on her character, Ashlynn Brooke stated "My personality is kind of close to hers, humor-wise". Lisa Ann remarked "I’m a huge Tina Fey fan, so playing her in 30 Rock was incredible ... These roles have been the most fun I've had in my career, and I can’t wait to see what’s next!".

Cast
 Amy Ried as Cherry
 Ashlynn Brooke as Jenny
 Chris Cannon as Fred
 Paul Woodcrest as Ken
 Erik Everhard as Ken body double for sex scenes
 Evie Delatosso as Alicia
 Herschel Savage  as Jake
 James Deen as Danny
 Lana Violet as Nancy
 Lisa Ann as Limon
 Ralph Long as Peter
 Rebeca Linares as Stephanie
 Bishop as Trey Jordan

Awards
Wins
 2010 AVN Award – Best Couples Sex Scene (Amy Ried and Ralph Long)

Nominations
 2010 AVN Award – Best Actor (Herschel Savage)
 2010 AVN Award – Best Supporting Actress (Ashlynn Brooke)
 2010 AVN Award – Best Non-Sex Performance (Bishop)
 2010 AVN Award – Best Non-Sex Performance (Paul Woodcrest)
 2010 AVN Award – Best Threeway Sex Scene (Lana Violet, Rebeca Linares and Erik Everhard)
 2010 AVN Award – Best Makeup (Maria and Glenn Alfonso)
 2010 AVN Award – Best On-Line Marketing Campaign, Individual Project
 2010 AVN Award – Best Sex Parody
 2010 XBIZ Award – Director of the Year, Individual Project (Lee Roy Myers)
 2010 XBIZ Award – Acting Performance of the Year, Male (Herschel Savage)
 2010 XBIZ Award – Marketing Campaign of the Year
 2010 XBIZ Award – Parody Release of the Year

References

External links
 
 
 

2000s pornographic films
A XXX Parody
2009 films
American pornographic films
AVN Award winners
2000s English-language films
Pornographic parody films
Films directed by Lee Roy Myers
Films set in New York City
2000s American films